The 2018 protests in Iran (Persian: اعتراضات سال ۲۰۱۸ در ایران) is mass protests and a popular uprising conspiring of peaceful demonstrations calling for better economic justice in June 2018 in Iran, the biggest wave of anti-government demonstrations since the 2017-2018 Iranian protests.

Background
The 2017-2018 Iranian protests is a wave of protests against the government after egg prices soared and a new budget law was passed, triggering deadly anti-government uprisings across the nation, leaving 23-25 killed in 11 days of mass protests. The 2018 Dervish protests is protests against discrimination that has left 1 dead. The protests was against economic hardships and failures to keep the country thriving.

Protests
March 28-March 31:
The 2018 Khuzestan protests erupted in the southern region of Khuzestan, leaving 1-2 killed in demonstrations against discrimination of Iranian Arabs. Clashes with police ensued into crackdown. On 29-31 March, after weeks of protests across the country, mass protests against wate shortages erupted throughout Isfahan, leading to clashes with the security forces, protesting polluted water and water shortages (Water crisis in Iran). Protesters and angry farmers rallied and demonstrated on 10 April and fight the security forces, who responded with Tear gas.

April 14-June 2:
A wave of truckers strikes was launched after truckers went on strike in Baneh and Isfahan, where shopkeepers closed their stores and shops and went on strike to protest economic failures and worsening conditions. The strike actions continue for 20 days. From 24 May till 4 June, a wave of popular strike campaigns was launched after truckers didn't receive their demands and demanded wage increases despite economic teeters in Isfahan. After the campaigns, police crackdown hard on protesters. Over the next 4-6 weeks, hundreds of merchant and trader unions went on strike, protesting against economic turmoil, demanding better wages and unemployment to stagnate.

25 June:
On 25 June 2018, shops were shut and thousands gathered in the Bazaar area of Tehran to protest the economic situation. This was met with security forces firing tear gas at the protestors. Protests against the economic situation also occurred in Shahriar, Karaj, Qeshm, Bandar Abbas, and Mashhad. Some of the stores were closed enforcedly by unknown individuals.

26 June:
People in Tehran took to the streets for the third straight day on 26 June, with many shops in Tehran's Bazaar remaining closed. Videos from social media showed the crowd in downtown Tehran chanting "Death to the dictator" and "Death to Palestine". Security forces clamped down on the protesters once again, arresting a large number of people.

Strikes and protests were also seen in Kermanshah, Arak and Tabriz.

27 June:
Protests continued for a third day in Tehran, despite a heavy security presence, Reuters referred to the three days as "the biggest unrest since the start of the year". Iran's Supreme Leader, Ali Khamenei, addressed the protests for the first time and called on the judiciary to punish those who disrupted economic security. Many of the protests involved traders in the Grand Bazaar in Tehran, who complained that the devaluation of the Iranian rial had forced them to stop trading.

28 June:
On 28 June, sources told Radio Farda that merchants had closed down the Bazaar in the city of Arak. Tehran's prosecutor general stated that a large number of protesters had been arrested and would likely face trial. Jafar Dolatabadi also stated in an interview that the protesters grievances are not only economic, and that "people are grappling with political and social concerns".

July:
A new protest movement erupted across Iran by tens of thousands of protesting teachers and students, called “No to Pay Slips and Salary Policies” over unpaid and unfair wages for teachers, that lasted for nearly three weeks, teachers are now deprived of an “appropriate salary budget, and as a result, the quality of education has also been lowered for students”. The protests began online but after a couple of days of online protests, marches and large demonstrations began on the streets in 15 July, the protests resulted in no achievement in Fars and Qazvin.

See also
 2017-2018 Iranian protests

References

2018 in Iran
2018 protests
Protests in Iran